Aldabrinus is a genus of pseudoscorpions, which contains the following species:

 Aldabrinus aldabrinus

References 

Garypinidae
Pseudoscorpion genera